{{DISPLAYTITLE:C4H8S}}
The molecular formula C4H8S (molar mass: 88.17 g/mol, exact mass: 88.0347 u) may refer to:

 Allyl methyl sulfide
 Tetrahydrothiophene, also known as thiophane, thiolane, or THT

Molecular formulas